Kobi Joseph Henry (born April 26, 2004) is an American professional soccer player who plays as a center-back for Championnat National 2 club Reims B.

Club career

Early career 
Born in Lakeland, Florida, Henry was part of the Florida Rush soccer academy before joining Orlando City's youth side in 2018. He then joined the Inter Miami academy a year later, before signing a professional contract with the USL Championship side Orange County SC on June 18, 2020. He made his competitive debut for the club on August 22, 2020, against LA Galaxy II. He came on as a stoppage-time substitute for Brian Iloski as Orange County won 2–1. Henry won the 2021 USL Championship Playoffs with Orange County, although he was an unused sub in the game against the Tampa Bay Rowdies.

Reims 
On June 14, 2022, Henry signed for the French club Stade de Reims on a five-year contract. The transfer fee paid to Orange County was $700,000, a record in the USL Championship. He was initially assigned to Reims's reserve side in the Championnat National 2.

International career
Henry has represented the Under States national under-17 team. He was called up to the United States senior camp in December 2021 but did not appear in the game against Bosnia and Herzegovina.

Career statistics

Club

Honors
Orange County SC
USL Championship: 2021

References

External links
Profile at the US Soccer Development Academy website

2004 births
Living people
People from Walton County, Florida
American soccer players
Association football defenders
Orange County SC players
Stade de Reims players
USL Championship players

Soccer players from Florida
United States men's youth international soccer players
United States men's under-20 international soccer players
Sportspeople from Lakeland, Florida
American expatriate soccer players
Expatriate footballers in France
American expatriate sportspeople in France